Juster may refer to:

People named Juster
A. M. Juster (born 1956), American poet
Kenneth Juster (born 1954), American Under Secretary of Commerce at the Bureau of Industry and Security
Norton Juster (1929–2021), American architect and writer
Samuel Juster (1896–1982), American architect of New York

Companies
DePace & Juster, defunct architecture firm based in New York City